Bazil Broketail is a 1992 fantasy novel by author Christopher Rowley, the name of its main character, and the name of the further series of books featuring him. Bazil is a leatherback dragon serving in the Marneri legions of the Argonath empire on the world of Ryetelth. The series has been reformatted for digital eBooks with new visuals and expanded text under the title Battle Dragons, published by Voyager.World.

There are currently seven books in the series:
Bazil Broketail (1992)
A Sword for a Dragon (1993)
Dragons of War (1994)
Battledragon (1995)
A Dragon at Worlds' End (1997)
Dragons of Argonath (1998)
Dragon Ultimate (1999)

History
Ryetleth is the name of the world where most of the events in the book take place. It contains two continents and has seen several empires in its history. The first is Veronath, which was known as the Golden Kingdom. It was brought down by the machinations of the demon lord Mach Ingbok, servant of wizards known as the Masters of Padmasa. Outside of the area of Veronath there are small islands known as the Cunfshon Isles. The Cunfshon Isles eventually created an army and pushed the Demonlord out of his hold to form a new empire, the Argonath. The Argonath empire was built on the ruins of the ancient kingdom of Veronath. This empire has stood ever since, gaining a tenuous hold against the great and terrible Masters of Padmasa. The Witches of the Cunfshon Isles have fought ever since to defeat the Masters.

Background information

Concerning Dragons
"Dragons" might be an incorrect term in labeling most of the dragons in this series. They are actually wingless Wyverns with vestigial wing nubs, indicating their once dragon heritage, but later evolved into aquatic creatures. The original Wyverns who agreed to fight for the Legions were predators of the coastal areas. There are true dragons in this series - winged dragons who live wild in the far icy north. None of the dragons, winged or wyvern, are able to breathe fire, although there is mention that the ancestors of the dragons were able to. The wild, winged dragons and wingless Wyverns are genetically similar enough to successfully produce offspring, and speak the same draconic language, though wild dragons generally despise the Wyverns for their dependence on humans.

There are four main types of Wyvern: Leatherback, Hard Green, Gristle, and Brasshide. The Leatherbacks are medium sized dragons, usually weighing around two tons and standing 10–12 feet tall. They are the perfect mixture of strength and speed, and are of a medium intelligence. Leatherbacks of note include Bazil himself, Jumble, Weft, Fury, and Cham. Hard Greens are about the same size and weight as Leatherbacks, but distinguished by harder scaleplates and often high strung temperament. Greens mentioned are Gryff, Anther, Smilgax of Troat, and Hexarion. A sub-breed, Freemartins, are female dragons who were born sterile, and can presumably be of any breed, although the only identified Freemartins (Nesessitas and Alsebra) are both Greens. A third Freemartin named Zed Dek is mentioned, but not identified. Freemartins are generally faster and smarter than other types. Their sterility makes them unable to "fertilize the eggs" as the dragons express it. Gristles are almost non existent in the series (no named character is a Gristle), and the breed is rarely mentioned beyond the first book. The only clue as to their appearance is that they are "hard and angular". The brasshides are the largest of the dragons, weighing in well over two tons. They are slow, ponderous, and deliberate, in both thought and deed. However, with the exception of larger, wild, winged dragons, like the Purple Green, they are easily the strongest of dragons.  Well known Brasshides include Chektor, Rusp, Churn, Kepabar, and Burthong. Crullos, a type of brasshide light purple in  color also exist, but are rare, (only one, named Vaunce, is mentioned). Dragons cannot see the color purple, and refer to Crullos as "blue".

Dragons are known for two things: fighting and eating. The dragons form the equivalent of tanks, a heavy stiffening force for eliminating the enemy's own shock troops. Cavalry roles are still filled by horses, who grow uneasy around the scent of dragon, causing a strong rivalry between the dragon and cavalry branches. Their hunger for battle is only matched by their hunger for food. While in the Legions they are fed well, albeit on basic foodstuffs such as noodles, stirabout, oatmeal, and bread. The only reason dragons are able to eat these basics foods continually is because of the sauce known as akh, a much-craved combination of onions, garlic, peppers, and other spices. They indulge their carnivorous heritage with seafood and the flesh of downed trolls and horses.

Concerning Argonath

The Argonath empire is built on the ruins of Veronath. The peoples still speak Verio. The significant change is that in the empire of the Argonath, men and women are truly equal. Women can do anything and everything men can do, with the sole exception of serving on the front lines, as that would incur too high a risk of capture. In fact, the people of the Argonath worship the Great Mother, their omnipotent Goddess. However, for some, the gods of old Veronath still exist. The three covered in the books are Caymo, the god of chance and wine; Asgah, god of war; and Gongo, the ruler of hell and the dead.

The Argonath people fight a constant war against the armies of Padmasa. They are occasionally assisted by the Sinni, a race of demigods that come from other worlds or dimensions. Their war is a small facet of a massive struggle across the multiverse, known as the Sphereboard of Destiny, and Ryetleth itself is a bit player in the epic conflicts that sweep across it.

Concerning the Enemy
The Enemy is the nation of Padmasa, a harsh regime ruled by five self-proclaimed "Masters". These are men who have studied the arcane magics of death for centuries. Their magic is based primarily on death, and uses death and torture for its purposes. The Masters have found their most powerful magics to reside in the deaths of the wyverns, and hunted them severely before the reptiles joined with humans for mutual protection. The Masters want total control of Ryetelth, and the total subjugation of all its peoples.

Mesomasters are wizards who are on their way to becoming Masters. Directly below Masters in the chain of command, they also command foul death magics. They are often the agents of the Masters, going to other nations to personally ensure the success of the Master's plans.

The Dooms are large spheres of stone that are imbued with intelligence by the Masters. These Dooms rule different cities around Padmasa, including the Doom that was destroyed by Bazil Broketail at Tummuz Orgmeen, and the one that resides in the frozen fortress of Axoxo.

The enemy employs different types of creatures that make up their vast armies. With the exception of humans, they are all formed by magic, usually forcible impregnation of captive females (both women and female beasts such as cows). When in need, they may be fortified by the "black drink", a potion that brings immunity to fear.
Men: Raiders and mercenaries from other nations serve as officers and elite Padmasan troops, as well as spies, clerks and functionaries in the cities. Women are not seen on the front lines. Another human component is the tribal cavalry that ranges around the lands outside the Argonath.
Imps: Human women can spawn ten to twelve imps before dying. Imps are small, heavyset creatures roughly five feet tall, and the majority of the breeds are not as intelligent as humans.
Trolls: The Padmasan equivalent of dragons, trolls are taken one apiece from cattle. They are muscular and unintelligent creatures eight to nine feet tall. Different varieties exist, some bright enough to wield swords instead of the usual axes, and all enjoy a great resistance to magic. Trolls and dragons bear a particular hatred for each other.
Other Creations: Padmasa and its allies employ a variety of creatures, but none so often as the backbones of men, imps and trolls. They vary from mammoth-spawned ogres to man-sized swordfighters and enormous land-walking octopuses.

Characters

Human
Relkin: The primary human character in the books. He is an orphan from the small village of Quosh. Paired with the dragon Bazil at a young age, the two form one of the most feared and decorated fighting teams in all of the Argonath. Relkin is a quiet, introspective soul by nature, who often ends up in trouble through unfortunate events. More than anything, he wishes to finish his 10 years of Legion service and retire with his love Eilsa Ranarddaughter to a farm where he and his dragon will live out their days fat and happy.
Lessis of Valmes: Arguably the greatest witch of her time. Known as the "Grey Lady", she works within the Office of Unusual Insight, the secret espionage branch of the more public Office of Insight, the counterespionage agency. She is known as the Mistress of Birds, and has lived for well over 500 years.
Lagdalen of the Tarcho: A noble woman born of the house Tarcho, she was something of a wild child in her younger days. Getting herself into a series of events, she was eventually kicked out of the Temple of the Great Mother. However, Lessis saw in Lagdalen the ability to be a great witch, and has taken Lagdalen as an assistant. Lagdalen has proved invaluable to the great witches, often helping them complete great spells that take much concentration. She is married to Captain Hollien Kesepton, and has a small baby named Lamina.
Ribela of Defwode: The only witch with the ability to match Lessis. Ribela is known as the Queen of Mice, and prefers to battle the evil Masters on the Astral plane. She spends hundreds of years there, and then is recalled to the planet Ryetelth to serve in the battle against the masters. Cold and stern, Ribela almost looks down on ordinary humans, whom she finds fragile and subject to ruling emotions. She has a dislike and distrust of men, and often uses magic to quickly do what Lessis would spend hours or days doing through peaceful negotiations.
Captain Hollein Kesepton: As the grandson of the famous General Kesepton, Hollein is a military man who starts the series as a captain in the Legions of Argonath with a small patrol command. His command doesn't respect him as a commander originally and because of his youth and connection with General Kesepton they believe he never earned the right to command them. This couldn't be further from the truth. Through numerous acts of valor and strength he proves himself a mighty and respected leader. He marries Lagdalen Tarcho, and has a daughter with her.
Swane of Revenant: A hot-headed youth who serves in the Dragon Corps with Relkin, he tends the leatherback Vlok. Swane is more brawn than brain, which occasionally gets him into trouble. He is torn between his admiration for Relkin, and his desire to be the most popular dragonboy in the unit.
Mono: The only other founding member of the "Fighting 109th" still alive, along with Relkin. He tends the brasshide Chektor. Mono, although present constantly, plays a very small role in the series, and is often heard from only once or twice per book.
Manuel: The only dragonboy who isn't an orphan, Manuel went to the Dragon Academy where he learned the science behind dragon lore. Easily the most educated of the dragonboys, he has a hard time being accepted by the others. He tends the Purple-Green, the only wild dragon to ever serve in the Legions.

Dragons
Bazil Broketail: The most famous dragon the Legion has ever produced, with the possible exception of the great champion Vastrox. He has single-handedly defeated the Doom of Tummuz Orgmeen, an ancient Malcostrican snake demon, a Mesomaster, the greatest of the evil Masters, and many other foes. He became known as the broketail when early in his career his tail was sliced off, and regrown by witch magic. Bazil, being particularly resistant to all forms of magic due to his dragon nature, was only able to regrow a tail that was oddly bent and greyish in color. After this regrowth the tail becomes much more dexterous than the original. He was even able to use the tail sword, a rare ability. His original sword was "Piocar" from his home village in Quosh. Later on he fights with a magic elf-forged blade "Ecator" that was made with the spirit of a cat of the same name, who was the king of mice. The blade cannot be broken.
The Purple Green of Hook Mountain: The only wild dragon to ever serve in the Legions. Originally introduced when he fought with Bazil over the mating rights to the Wild Green Dragoness. He was injured by Bazil, who, taking pity, bound the wounds on the great dragon, and had him hidden in a cave to heal. Unfortunately, the dragon was found by the servants of the Masters, and was taken back to Tummuz Orgmeen where his wings were clipped and he was kept as a combatant in a great arena. Breaking free, he subsequently decided to join the Legions after his wings were grown back by the witches (though grown back, they have no strength to fly). What he lacks in soldier and sword skills, he makes up for in sheer strength and ferocity. Also, he is the unofficial troublemaker of the 109th, often chafing at the rules the Legion places on dragons. He reminds all of the Wyverns of their wild side, sometimes to disastrous ends. Like Chektor, he uses a Legion Issue sword that is not named.
Chektor: A brasshide and the only other surviving founding dragon of the 109th. Chektor, like his dragonboy Mono, plays an unusually small role in the books. Very little is known about him, except that he has very tender feet. He fights with an unnamed Legion Issue sword.
Alsebra: A freemartin wyvern, Alsebra is the opposite of the Purple Green. Disciplined, and having a tremendous skill with the sword, she is easily the smartest of the dragons. She grew up very close to people, and as a consequence she is the only dragon that refuses to eat horses, whom she finds beautiful. Her sword is named "Undaunt".
Vlok: Arguably the dumbest dragon in the 109th. Wielding the sword "Katzbalger", he begins as a rival to Bazil, (a position later given to the Hard Green Gryff, tended by Rakama), but is ultimately relegated to the role of sycophant and sidekick to Bazil and, to a lesser extent, the Purple-Green. However, while Vlok is dumb, he has a very good grasp of the simple pleasures in life, such as eating and fighting. His sword's name also refers to the short swords used by medieval Swiss soldiers.

Book series introduced in 1992
American literature
Novels about dragons
Fantasy novel series
Novels by Christopher Rowley